Things That Make Living Worthwhile is a 2004 Spanish romantic comedy-drama film directed by Manuel Gómez Pereira, starring Ana Belén and Eduard Fernández.

Plot 
The plot features the relationship between Hortensia, a divorced woman working as a civil officer at the INEM, and Jorge, an also divorced unemployed man and recovering alcoholic.

Cast

Production 
The film was directed by Manuel Gómez Pereira whereas the screenplay was penned by Joaquín Oristrell, Yolanda García Serrano,  and Luis Piedrahita. It was produced by BocaBoca Producciones with the participation of TVE and Canal+.

Release 
The film screened at the 7th Málaga Spanish Film Festival (FMCE) in 2004. Distributed by Columbia Tristar Spain, the film was theatrically released in Spain on 26 November 2004.

Reception 
Jonathan Holland of Variety deemed the film be "an enjoyable, adult-oriented comedy romancer beefed up by a thought-provoking darker side".

Mirito Torreiro of Fotogramas gave it 4 out of 5 stars highlighting the chemistry between the leads to be the best about the film.

Accolades 

|-
| align = "center" | 2004 || 7th Málaga Spanish Film Festival || colspan = "2" |  Public Choice Award ||  || 
|-
| align = "center" rowspan = "4" | 2005 || rowspan = "2" | 19th Goya Awards || Best Actor || Eduard Fernández ||  || rowspan = "2" | 
|-
| Best Actress || Ana Belén || 
|-
| rowspan = "2" | 14th Actors and Actresses Union Awards || Best Film Actor in a Leading Role || Eduard Fernández ||  || rowspan = "2" | 
|-
| Best Film Actress in a Leading Role || Ana Belén || 
|}

See also 
 List of Spanish films of 2004

References

External links 
 
 Things That Make Living Worthwhile at ICAA's Catálogo de Cinespañol

2004 films
2004 romantic comedy-drama films
2000s Spanish-language films
BocaBoca Producciones films
Films shot in Madrid
Spanish romantic comedy-drama films
2000s Spanish films